A Norwegian coupling (or meat chopper) or claw hammer coupling or pickaxe coupling is a manual coupling consisting of a central buffer with a mechanical hook that drops into a slot in the central buffer. Norwegian couplings are not particularly strong, and may be supplemented by auxiliary chains. Not all Norwegian couplings are compatible with one another as they vary in height and width, and may or may not be limited to one hook at a time.

The Norwegian coupling was developed in Norway around 1870, when the main domestic railway net was built to  narrow gauge. Later, during the 20th century, these lines were rebuilt into  or closed. This meant that the rolling stock needed to be replaced, and buffers and chain coupler got used instead. Only museum railways, such as the Setesdal Line and Urskog–Høland Line, use it in Norway nowadays.
The New Zealand Government Railways, during the 1970s, developed an extremely large and heavy-duty version of the chopper coupler. These were first applied to a fleet of General Electric locomotives (U26C class DX), which had arrived from the United States with Janney couplers. However, they were converted once it was decided that these locomotives would operate on other than just the North Island Main Trunk express freight trains.

On railway lines where rolling stock always points the same way, the mechanical hook may be provided only on one end of each wagon.  This was the situation on the Lynton & Barnstaple (L&B), a narrow gauge line in Devon, England, and still applies to railways in New Zealand and on the Isle of Man Railway. Similarly, the hand brake handles may also be on one side of the wagons only. The L&B originally used side chains in conjunction with Norwegian couplers, but these were found to be unnecessary with the slow speeds employed and were removed within a year or so of the line opening in 1898. The Isle of Man Railway still couples its side chains in operation today.

Kenyan railways, Uganda Railways, Tanzanian Railways and Mountain Railways of India also use the Norwegian coupler.

Former Staatsspoorwegen (today Indonesian Railway Company) in the Dutch East Indies (today Indonesia) used Norwegian coupler for their  rolling stocks.

The Pichi Richi Railway in South Australia uses Norwegian couplers as its standard, and converts Janney coupler to Norwegian as required. The slot in the "buffer beam" where the coupler protrudes appears to be about the same for both types of couplers. As a museum, it is appropriate to use the older type of coupling.

Gallery

See also 
 Bell-and-hook coupler
 Draft gear
 Nilgiri Mountain Railway
 Railway coupling by country

References 

Couplers